Aberdesach is a small village in a primarily Welsh speaking area of Gwynedd. It is in the historic county of Caernarfonshire. The village is situated approximately 1.5 miles south of the neighbouring village of Pontllyfni and 6 miles south of the county town of Caernarfon.

External links 

www.geograph.co.uk : photos of Aberdesach and surrounding area

Villages in Gwynedd
Clynnog